Francisco Javier Hidalgo Gómez (born 30 March 1994), commonly known as Son, is a Spanish professional footballer who plays for Levante UD. Mainly a right back, he can also play as a right winger.

Club career
Born in Seville, Andalusia, Son was an AD Nervión youth graduate, being also regularly utilized with the first team in the regional leagues. The following July, he joined Tercera División side CD Alcalá.

In July 2014, Son moved to CD San Roque de Lepe in Segunda División B, and became a regular starter as his club achieved an impressive ninth position. He subsequently represented fellow third division sides UCAM Murcia CF, CF Villanovense, Atlético Levante UD, Barakaldo CF and SD Ponferradina; with the latter side he achieved promotion to Segunda División in 2019.

Son made his professional debut on 18 August 2019, starting in a 3–1 away loss against Cádiz CF. He was an undisputed starter for Ponfe during the campaign, appearing in 40 matches (37 as a starter) as his side avoided relegation.

On 23 July 2020, Son agreed to a four-year contract with La Liga side Levante UD. He made his top tier debut on 1 October, starting in a 0–1 away loss against Sevilla FC.

References

External links

1994 births
Living people
Spanish footballers
Footballers from Seville
Association football defenders
Association football wingers
La Liga players
Segunda División players
Segunda División B players
Tercera División players
Divisiones Regionales de Fútbol players
CD San Roque de Lepe footballers
UCAM Murcia CF players
CF Villanovense players
Atlético Levante UD players
Barakaldo CF footballers
SD Ponferradina players
Levante UD footballers